Talin (also spelled Taleen) is a town in northwestern Syria, administratively part of the Tartus Governorate, located between Baniyas (to the west) and al-Qadmus (to the east). It is situated in the Syrian Coastal Mountain Range. According to the Syria Central Bureau of Statistics, Talin had a population of 3,699 in the 2004 census. It is the administrative center of the Talin Subdistrict which contained five localities with a collective population of 8,351 in 2004. Its inhabitants are predominantly Alawites.

References

Alawite communities in Syria
Populated places in Baniyas District
Towns in Syria